Christ's Church of the Valley (CCV) is a non-denominational Christian church megachurch located in Metropolitan Phoenix, Arizona. The church has several campuses in Arizona. Weekend church attendance was 32,000.

History
Christ's Church of the Valley was founded by pastor Dr. Donald Wilson in 1982 with services held in a rented movie theater. Christ's Church of the Valley also held services in an elementary school and a strip mall for a short period of time. In 1996, Christ's Church of the Valley found a permanent home, after raising over $1 million in one day to purchase 50 acres of land in the northwest Phoenix.
For the first four years on the new property, Christ's Church of the Valley held services in a ‘sprung’ structure with seating for 1,100. In January 2004, Christ's Church of the Valley moved into their current 4,500 seat multi-use structure on a 100-acre campus. In 2006, CCV built two new buildings for its children and youth ministries from over $8 million in funding, raised in one weekend. These buildings opened in fall 2008.

As of 2016, it had 6 campuses in Maricopa County.

On October 29, 2017, Don Wilson, CCV's founding pastor stepped down as Senior Pastor after 35 years at CCV. His replacement was Ashley Wooldridge, who was an Executive Pastor and a Teaching Pastor at the church for ten years prior.

According to a church census released in 2019, it claimed a weekly attendance of 32,107 people and 9 campuses in different cities.

See also
List of the largest evangelical churches
List of the largest evangelical church auditoriums
Worship service (evangelicalism)

References

External links
 CCV Official Website

Evangelical churches in Arizona
Religious organizations based in Arizona
Evangelical megachurches in the United States
Culture of Peoria, Arizona
Christian organizations established in 1982
Christian denominations established in the 20th century
Churches in Maricopa County, Arizona
Buildings and structures in Peoria, Arizona
1982 establishments in Arizona
Megachurches in Arizona